The UTEP Miners women's basketball team represents University of Texas at El Paso in women's basketball. The school competes in Conference USA in Division I of the National Collegiate Athletic Association (NCAA). The Miners play home basketball games at Don Haskins Center in El Paso, Texas.

History
As of the end of the 2015–16 season, the Lady Miners have a 539–625 all-time record.

NCAA tournament results

References

External links